Copelatus hydroporoides is a species of diving beetle. It is part of the genus Copelatus in the subfamily Copelatinae of the family Dytiscidae. It was described by Murray in 1859.

References

hydroporoides
Beetles described in 1859